Swell Foop is a fantasy novel by British-American writer Piers Anthony, the twenty-fifth book of the Xanth series.
 
The title is taken from a spoonerism for the Shakespearean phrase "one fell swoop," famously (but not first)  spoken by the tongue-twisted Peter Sellers character in the 1964 movie The Pink Panther.

Plot summary
Cynthia Centaur and her companions must find the Six Rings of Xanth (Air, Earth, Fire, Water, Void, and the Idea) in order to find the Swell Foop and use it to rescue the Demon E(A/R)th from the thrall of the Demoness Fornax.

Characters 

Cynthia Centaur
Che Centaur
Sim
Jaylin
The Demons FO(R\N)ax, JU(P/I)ter, M(A/R)s, V(E\N)us, E(A/R)th and ME(R/C)ury
Justin Tree
Breanna

References

External links

American fantasy novels
 25
2001 American novels
Tor Books books